Terraube (Gascon: Terrauba) is a commune in the Gers department in southwestern France.

History

During the early stages of the French Wars of Religion in September 1562, many of the largely Protestant inhabitants were massacred by order of the Royalist commander Blaise de Montluc, and their bodies thrown into a well.

Geography

Population

See also
Communes of the Gers department

References

Sources
 

Communes of Gers